James Maguire may refer to:

James G. Maguire (1853–1920), American politician
James Maguire (basketball) (born 1939), Canadian basketball player
James Rochfort Maguire (1855–1925), British imperialist and Irish Nationalist politician and MP
James Maguire (rugby union) (1886–1966), New Zealand rugby union player
Jim Maguire (Irish footballer)
Jim Maguire (Australian footballer) (1918–1990), Australian rules football player (Hawthorn)
Jim Maguire (footballer, born 1932), Scottish footballer (Rochdale AFC)
Jamie Maguire, character of the British television drama series Shameless